Sylwia Pycia (born 20 April 1981) is a Polish volleyball player, a member of Poland women's national volleyball team, European Champion 2005, silver medalist of European Games 2015, Polish Champion (2008, 2009).

Career
In 2005, she achieved title of European Champion. She took part in 1st edition of European Games. In semi final her national team beat Serbia and qualified to final match. On June 27, 2015 Poland was beaten by Turkey and Pycia with her team mates winning a silver medal.

In April 2017 she decided to end up her career.

Sporting achievements

National team
 2005  CEV European Championship
 2015  European Games

State awards
 2005  Gold Cross of Merit

References

External links
 ORLEN Liga player profile

1981 births
Living people
Sportspeople from Kraków
Polish women's volleyball players
Recipients of the Gold Cross of Merit (Poland)
Volleyball players at the 2015 European Games
European Games medalists in volleyball
European Games silver medalists for Poland
21st-century Polish women